Visitors to Cameroon must obtain a visa from one of the Cameroonian diplomatic missions unless they come from one of the visa exempt countries.

Visa policy map

Visa exemption 
Citizens of the following seven countries can visit Cameroon without a visa for up to 90 days:

1 – Only ordinary passport holders may enter without a visa.

Non-ordinary passports 
In addition, holders of diplomatic or service category passports issued to nationals of the following countries do not require a visa to enter Cameroon for a stay up to the duration listed below:

2 – Only diplomatic passport holders may enter without a visa.

Visa on arrival 
Holders of diplomatic and service passports can obtain a visa on arrival if they have a mission order and a return ticket.

An agreement allowing nationals of the  holding ordinary passports to obtain a visa on arrival was signed in October 2019, but has yet to enter into force. Nevertheless, UAE nationals who hold a service passport may obtain a visa on arrival for a maximum stay of 30 days.

Transit 
Transit without visa is allowed for travellers continuing their trip by the same or first connecting plane within 24 hours and without leaving the airport.

Proof of Yellow Fever Vaccination is required for all travelers to Cameroon.

See also 

 Visa requirements for Cameroonian citizens

References 

Cameroon
Foreign relations of Cameroon